H2PTM, or Hypertext Hypermedia Products Tools and Methods, is an international conference on hypermedia. The first congress was held in Paris in 1989 and was organized by the Paragraphe Lab at the University of Paris VIII.

In 2009, H2PTM celebrated its 20th anniversary with a conference held in Paris in November. 

1989 establishments in France
Hypermedia
Recurring events established in 1989
Technology conferences
University of Paris 8 Vincennes-Saint-Denis